Barry Opdam (born 27 February 1976) is a Dutch retired footballer who played as a central defender.

He spent most of his 16-year professional career with AZ, amassing Eredivisie totals of 316 games and 13 goals over the course of 11 seasons, all with that club.

Club career
Born in Leiden, South Holland, Opdam began his professional career with AZ Alkmaar, being relegated to the second division in his first year and immediately promoting back in the following. Subsequently, he became an undisputed starter for the North Holland side, amassing more than 400 official appearances.

Not known as a goal scorer, Opdam scored an essential one in the second leg of the 2006–07 UEFA Cup round-of-32 clash against Fenerbahçe SK. After a 3–3 draw in Istanbul, the Turkish led 2–0 at half-time, and the defender headed home from a Julian Jenner free kick with seven minutes to go, making it 2–2 and sending his team to the next round on away goals rule (eventually reaching the last-eight stage); in the 2004–05 edition AZ reached the semifinals of the competition, the second time in 24 years.

In 2008, one year after finishing second in the Dutch Cup, 32-year-old Opdam had his first abroad experience, signing for Austrian club FC Red Bull Salzburg. After two seasons, being an important defensive unit in the conquest of back-to-back national championships, he returned to his country, joining FC Volendam in the second level.

International career
On 4 June 2005, Opdam made his debut for the Netherlands in a 2–0 win against Romania for the 2006 FIFA World Cup qualifiers. On 8 October, in the same competition, he scored his first and only international goal, in a 2–0 win against the Czech Republic.

Opdam would be, however, overlooked by national team coach Marco van Basten for the final stages in Germany, gaining a total of eight caps.

Club statistics

Honours
AZ
Second Division: 1997–98
Dutch Cup: Runner-up 2006–07

Red Bull
Austrian League: 2008–09, 2009–10

References

External links

1976 births
Living people
Footballers from Leiden
Dutch footballers
Association football defenders
Eredivisie players
Eerste Divisie players
FC Lisse players
AZ Alkmaar players
FC Volendam players
Austrian Football Bundesliga players
FC Red Bull Salzburg players
Netherlands international footballers
Dutch expatriate footballers
Expatriate footballers in Austria
Dutch expatriate sportspeople in Austria